The 2002–03 Washington Huskies men's basketball team represented the University of Washington for the 2002–03 NCAA Division I men's basketball season. Led by first-year head coach Lorenzo Romar, the Huskies were members of the Pacific-10 Conference and played their home games on campus at Hec Edmundson Pavilion in 

They did not qualify for the eight-team conference tournament; a road loss in the season finale to struggling UCLA dropped Washington to ninth. The year's notable victory was over Stanford in mid-January, the first win over the Cardinal in 

Alumnus Romar was hired in April 2002; previously the head coach at Saint Louis, he led the Husky program for fifteen years.

References

External links
Sports Reference – Washington Huskies: 2002–03 basketball season

Washington Huskies men's basketball seasons
Washington Huskies
Washington
Washington